Over Time is the fifth compilation album released by the Oakland, California-based, underground hip hop collective, Hieroglyphics.  The album was released on March 20, 2007 by the group's own independent record label, Hieroglyphics Imperium Recordings.

Track listing 
 "You Never Knew (Domino remix)" (Producer Domino) (Artists:  Hieroglyphics) – 04:31
 "Masterminds" (Producer Del tha Funkee Homosapien) (Artist: Del tha Funkee Homosapien) (featuring Tajai) – 05:44
 "Prose Officially" (Producer Jay Biz) (Artists: Pep Love, Jay Biz) – 04:07
 "Greed" (Producer Kool DJ EQ) (Artist: A-Plus) – 03:20
 "Phoney Phranchise (Domino Remix)" (Producer Domino) (Artist: Del tha Funkee Homosapien) – 05:20
 "Soundscience (Remix)" (Producer Tommy Tee), (Artists: Souls of Mischief) – 03:43
 "It's About Time" (Producer Del tha Funkee Homosapien) (Artist: Del tha Funkee Homosapien) – 04:36
 "The Scandle" (Producer Casual) (Artist: Casual) – 4:06
 "Battle of the Shadow" (Producer A-Plus) (Artist: Del tha Funkee Homosapien) (featuring A-Plus) – 04:06
 "Fight Club (Remix)"(Producer Casual) (Artist: Pep Love) – 04:28
 "Unseen Hand" (Producer Opio) (Artists: Souls of Mischief) – 04:14
 "If You Must (Automator Remix)" (Producer Dan the Automator) (Artist: Del tha Funkee Homosapien) – 04:08
 "Heat" (Producer Casual) (Artists: Hieroglyphics) – 04:54
 "Cyberpunks" (Producer Del tha Funkee Homosapien) (Artist: Del tha Funkee Homosapien) – 06:00

References

External links 
 Over Time at Audio Lunch Box
 Over Time at Hieroglyphics.com

2007 compilation albums
Hieroglyphics (group) albums
Hieroglyphics Imperium Recordings compilation albums